The 2008 Arizona Wildcats baseball team represented the University of Arizona in the 2008 NCAA Division I baseball season. The Wildcats played their home games at Jerry Kindall Field at Frank Sancet Stadium. The team was coached by Andy Lopez in his 7th season at Arizona.

Personnel

Roster

Coaches

Opening day

Schedule and results

Ann Arbor Regional

Coral Gables Super Regional

2008 MLB Draft

References

Arizona Wildcats
Arizona Wildcats baseball seasons
Arizona baseball
Arizona